Bryan Lee Erickson (born March 7, 1960) is an American former professional ice hockey player.

Career 
Signed in 1983 as a free agent by the Washington Capitals after starring for the University of Minnesota men's ice hockey team, Erickson played parts of two seasons with the Capitals before he was traded to the Los Angeles Kings.

He also played with the Pittsburgh Penguins and Winnipeg Jets before retiring from active professional play after the 1993–94 NHL season. Erickson resides today in Roseau pursuing business interests.

Erickson frequently played for Team USA in international hockey. He was a member of the 1982, 1986 and 1987 Ice Hockey World Championship teams as well as the 1984 Canada Cup. On September 20, 2012, he was elected to the University of Minnesota "M" Club and was celebrated as part of the 2012 inductee group at the September 22, 2012 football game in which the University of Minnesota beat Syracuse University 17–10. As an integral part of the Minnesota family, the "M" Club endeavors to uphold and enrich the great tradition of Golden Gopher Athletics.

Awards and honors

Career statistics

Regular season and playoffs

International

References

External links

1960 births
Living people
People from Roseau, Minnesota
American men's ice hockey right wingers
Ice hockey players from Minnesota
Los Angeles Kings players
Minnesota Golden Gophers men's ice hockey players
Pittsburgh Penguins players
Undrafted National Hockey League players
Washington Capitals players
Winnipeg Jets (1979–1996) players